is a railway station on the Kabe Line in Hiroshima, Hiroshima Prefecture, Japan, operated by West Japan Railway Company (JR West). The station opened on 4 March 2017.

Lines
Kōdo-Homachigawa Station is served by the Kabe Line.

Layout
The station has one side platform serving a single bidirectional track at ground level.

History
The name of the new station was officially announced by JR West in July 2016.

Passenger statistics
The station is expected to be used by an average of approximately 1,800 passengers daily.

Surrounding area
  National Route 54
 Asakita Ward Office

See also
 List of railway stations in Japan

References

External links

 

Railway stations in Hiroshima Prefecture
Kabe Line
Stations of West Japan Railway Company
Railway stations in Japan opened in 2017